Ash to Brookwood Heaths is a  biological Site of Special Scientific Interest west of Guildford in Surrey. It is a Nature Conservation Review site, Grade I. It is part of the Thames Basin Heaths Special Protection Area and the Thursley, Ash, Pirbright and Chobham Special Area of Conservation.

This site has dry heathland, wet heath and bog. Large areas have been protected from development because they are army training ranges. The site is important for mosses and liverworts and there are nationally important populations of nightjars, woodlarks, Dartford warblers and hobbies.

References

Sites of Special Scientific Interest in Surrey
Nature Conservation Review sites
Special Protection Areas in England
Special Areas of Conservation in England